Nate Kaczor (born April 8, 1967) is an American football special teams coordinator for the Washington Commanders of the National Football League (NFL). He has also served that position for the Tennessee Titans and Tampa Bay Buccaneers.

Coaching career

College
Kaczor spent 17 years coaching in college and it all started at his alma mater Utah State. He played center for Utah State from 1987–1989. In 1991 he began his coaching career as an offensive assistant with them and was in that position until 1999. This was followed by four seasons as the offensive coordinator/quarterbacks coach at Nebraska-Kearney. After this he spent two years with Idaho as the teams co-offensive coordinator and tight ends coach. In 2006 he went to Louisiana-Monroe to be the team’s tight ends coach. In 2007 he was promoted to the co-offensive coordinator.

Jacksonville Jaguars
Kaczor entered the NFL as an assistant special teams coach with the Jacksonville Jaguars from 2008-2011.

Tennessee Titans
Nate would spend four years with the Titans, the first was as an assistant offensive line coach. However starting in 2013 he became the team’s special teams coordinator.

Tampa Bay Buccaneers
Nate spent 2016-2018 with the Tampa Bay Buccaneers as the team’s special teams coordinator.

Washington Redskins / Football Team / Commanders
In 2019, Nate was hired to be the Washington Redskins special teams coordinator. In 2020 even with the organization's head coaching change the Redskins decided to keep Kaczor as their special teams coordinator.

Family
Nate and his wife Angie have a son who played college baseball for East Tennessee State University and a daughter.

References

External links
Washington Commanders bio

Living people
1967 births
American football centers
Idaho Vandals football coaches
Jacksonville Jaguars coaches
People from Scott County, Kansas
Players of American football from Kansas
Tampa Bay Buccaneers coaches
Tennessee Titans coaches
Utah State Aggies football coaches
Utah State Aggies football players
Washington Commanders coaches
Washington Football Team coaches
Washington Redskins coaches